Michael Osakonor Tetteh (born 16 January 1989) is a former Ghanaian footballer.

Playing career

Youth and college 
Tetteh spent his youth career with Right to Dream Academy for six years and the Santa Barbara Soccer Club for three years before playing college soccer at UC Santa Barbara for the Gauchos. He was named Second Team All-Big West and Second Team Far West All-Region in 2009. Tetteh played in 59 games in his three years at UC Santa Barbara and scored 6 goals with 8 assists.

Club 
Tetteh was signed by Major League Soccer to a Generation Adidas contract and was subsequently drafted 20th overall in the 2011 MLS SuperDraft by Seattle Sounders FC on 13 January 2011.

He made his professional debut in a 2–1 win over Kitsap Pumas in the Lamar Hunt US Open Cup playing the full 90 minutes on 28 June 2011.

To gain more match experience, Tetteh was loaned to USL Pro club Orlando City SC on 29 June 2011 on a 10-day contract and returned to Seattle by 12 July. While with Orlando City, Tetteh appeared in three matches.

Tetteh was sent out on loan again, to the Fort Lauderdale Strikers of the North American Soccer League on 24 August 2012.

On 14 December 2012, the Sounders declined to pick up a contract option on Tetteh.

Career statistics

Honours

Seattle Sounders FC 
 Lamar Hunt US Open Cup (1): 2011

References

External links 
 
 
 UC Santa Barbara player profile

1989 births
Living people
Ghanaian footballers
Ghanaian expatriate footballers
UC Santa Barbara Gauchos men's soccer players
Seattle Sounders FC players
Orlando City SC (2010–2014) players
Fort Lauderdale Strikers players
Association football defenders
Expatriate soccer players in the United States
Seattle Sounders FC draft picks
USL Championship players
North American Soccer League players